Moley is a British computer-animated television series directed by Leon Joosen and produced by Tony Nottage at Nottage Productions, based on the stories written by James Reatchlous. The show revolves around Moley, an anthropomorphic mole who lives in MoleTown with his friends and other animals. A 30-minute special, Master Moley by Royal Invitation, aired in Europe, the Middle East, and Africa on Warner Bros. Discovery Boomerang UK channels in November 2020.

Production and broadcast 

Moley was initially produced as a 30-minute TV special titled Master Moley by Royal Invitation, which first aired on WarnerMedia channel Boomerang in EMEA territories on 28 November 2020.

The TV series, titled Moley, premiered with the first 26 11-minute episodes of a 52-episode season across WarnerMedia EMEA's Boomerang channel in over 119 countries in October 2021, with a further 26 episodes due for release in the spring of 2022.

The show made its free-to-air debut on Pop during Christmas 2022, starting with the special, the show was expected to fully debut on Pop in January 2023, but didn’t air, it is unknown if the show will air on Pop or not.

Plot 

The series follows Moley, a charming, optimistic young mole who lives deep in a burrow in the bustling city of MoleTown. Accompanied by a magical book named Manny, Moley travels around MoleTown learning about new mole cultures and sharing his knowledge of the human world above.

Though Moley is viewed by the citizens of MoleTown as wise and knowledgeable, he's no smarter than the average mole, and often finds himself on entertaining misadventures. His best friends Mona Lisa, Dotty, Mystic Mole, and Mishmosh always come to his rescue.

Characters 

 Moley (voiced by Warwick Davis)
 Manny the Magic Book
 Dotty (voiced by Jessica Henwick)
 Mona Lisa (voiced by Gemma Arterton)
 MishMosh (voiced by Stanley Tucci)
 Mystic Mole (voiced by Togo Igawa)
 The Gardener (voiced by Richard E. Grant)
 Squirm (voiced by Brigitta Nicas) 
 Lester (voiced by Trevor Dion Nicholas)

Episodes

References 

Boomerang (TV network) original programming
2020s British animated television series
2020s British children's television series
2020 British television series debuts
British children's animated comedy television series
English-language television shows
Animated television series about animals
British computer-animated television series